Juha Lappalainen (born 3 February 1973) is a Finnish wrestler. He competed in the men's Greco-Roman 69 kg at the 2000 Summer Olympics.

References

1973 births
Living people
Finnish male sport wrestlers
Olympic wrestlers of Finland
Wrestlers at the 2000 Summer Olympics
Sportspeople from Vantaa